Epworth Methodist Evangelical Church, also known as Trinity Baptist Temple, is a historic Gothic Revival church at 412 M. Street in Louisville, Kentucky. It was built in 1895 and added to the National Register of Historic Places in 1983.

It is a one-story gable-front building.  In 1983 it was the oldest of six surviving frame Gothic Revival churches in Louisville.

References

Methodist churches in Kentucky
Churches in Louisville, Kentucky
Baptist churches in Kentucky
Churches on the National Register of Historic Places in Kentucky
Gothic Revival church buildings in Kentucky
Churches completed in 1895
19th-century Methodist church buildings in the United States
National Register of Historic Places in Louisville, Kentucky
19th-century buildings and structures in Louisville, Kentucky
1895 establishments in Kentucky